Solimena is an Italian surname. Notable people with the surname include:

Angelo Solimena (1629–1716), Italian painter, father of Francesco
Francesco Solimena (1657–1747), Italian painter
Orazio Solimena (1690–1789), Italian painter

Italian-language surnames